Pamela Duncan may refer to:

 Pamela Duncan (novelist) (born 1961), American novelist
 Pamela Duncan (actress) (1924–2005), American B-movie actress